Bandbudh Aur Budbak is an Indian animated television series that originally aired on ZeeQ from 2015 to 2017. It has 156 episodes. This series is digitally available on ZEE5.

Episode list

References 

Lists of Indian television series episodes
Lists of animated television series episodes